The Book of the Penitence of Adam is a manuscript dealing with Kabbalistic traditions, all of which are embodied in the allegory it contains. 

The manuscript is an account of how Cain and Abel slew each other and how Adam's inheritance therefore passed to his third son, Seth. Seth was permitted to reach the gate of the Earthly Paradise without being attacked by the guardian angel with his flaming sword, and beheld the Trees of Life and Knowledge, which had joined to form a single tree, said to symbolise the harmony of science and religion in the Kabbalah. The guardian angel presented him with three seeds from this tree, which he was instructed to place in Adam's mouth when he died. From these grew the burning bush which God used to talk to Moses, who made his magic wand from part of it. This wand was placed in the Ark of the Covenant and was planted by King David on Mount Zion, where it grew into a triple tree which was cut down by Solomon to construct the pillars of Jachin and Boaz at the entrance to the Temple in Jerusalem. Another portion was inserted into the threshold of the great gate and permitted no unclean thing to enter the sanctuary. It was, however, removed by some wicked priests, weighted down by stones and thrown into the Temple reservoir, where it was hidden and guarded by an angel. During Christ's lifetime the reservoir was drained and the piece of wood found and used as a bridge across the brook of Kedron, over which Jesus passed after his arrest on the Mount of Olives. It was then made into the cross on which he was crucified.

The legend that the cross was ultimately made from the Tree of Knowledge was common in the Middle Ages and has similarities to the Holy Grail legend. It is also found in the 12th century Quete del St. Graal(Quest of the holy grail), attributed to Walter Map, who probably actually only edited it.

The original manuscript of the Book of the Penitence of Adam is now in the Bibliothèque de l'Arsenal in Paris.

See also
Life of Adam and Eve

References
 Bibliothèque nationale de France. Bibliothèque de l'Arsenal, Ms-2680''

Another version

Footnotes

Kabbalah texts

Old Testament pseudepigrapha
Jewish mysticism
Cain and Abel
Old Testament pseudepigrapha related with Adam and Eve